Talmage (variant, Talmadge) is a census-designated place (CDP) in Mendocino County, California, United States. The population was 986 at the 2020 census, down from 1,130 in 2010. It lies in the southeastern part of the Ukiah Valley and is home to the City of Ten Thousand Buddhas, one of the largest Chan Buddhist temples in the United States. The town's name honors early settler Junius Talmage.

Geography

Demographics

2010
At the 2010 census Talmage had a population of 1,130. The racial makeup of Talmage was 503 (44.5%) White, 3 (0.3%) African American, 27 (2.4%) Native American, 273 (24.2%) Asian, 4 (0.4%) Pacific Islander, 278 (24.6%) from other races, and 42 (3.7%) from two or more races. Hispanic or Latino of any race were 366 people (32.4%).

The census reported that 911 people (80.6% of the population) lived in households, 199 (17.6%) lived in non-institutionalized group quarters, and 20 (1.8%) were institutionalized.

There were 330 households, 120 (36.4%) had children under the age of 18 living in them, 153 (46.4%) were opposite-sex married couples living together, 41 (12.4%) had a female householder with no husband present, 26 (7.9%) had a male householder with no wife present.  There were 25 (7.6%) unmarried opposite-sex partnerships, and 5 (1.5%) same-sex married couples or partnerships. 85 households (25.8%) were one person and 25 (7.6%) had someone living alone who was 65 or older. The average household size was 2.76.  There were 220 families (66.7% of households); the average family size was 3.37.

The age distribution was 271 people (24.0%) under the age of 18, 137 people (12.1%) aged 18 to 24, 270 people (23.9%) aged 25 to 44, 338 people (29.9%) aged 45 to 64, and 114 people (10.1%) who were 65 or older.  The median age was 37.0 years. For every 100 females, there were 82.0 males.  For every 100 females age 18 and over, there were 80.5 males.

There were 382 housing units at an average density of 240.0 per square mile, of the occupied units 155 (47.0%) were owner-occupied and 175 (53.0%) were rented. The homeowner vacancy rate was 1.3%; the rental vacancy rate was 11.2%.  404 people (35.8% of the population) lived in owner-occupied housing units and 507 people (44.9%) lived in rental housing units.

2000
At the 2000 census there were 1,141 people, 327 households, and 229 families in the CDP. The racial makeup of the CDP was 57.41% White, 0.61% African American, 2.45% Native American, 16.48% Asian, 0.09% Pacific Islander, 17.62% from other races, and 5.35% from two or more races. Hispanic or Latino of any race were 27.17%.

Of the 327 households 44.3% had children under the age of 18 living with them, 49.2% were married couples living together, 15.9% had a female householder with no husband present, and 29.7% were non-families. 23.2% of households were one person and 8.9% were one person aged 65 or older.  The average household size was 2.87 and the average family size was 3.34.

The age distribution was 29.8% under the age of 18, 11.0% from 18 to 24, 29.2% from 25 to 44, 20.5% from 45 to 64, and 9.6% 65 or older.  The median age was 31 years. For every 100 females, there were 95.7 males.  For every 100 females age 18 and over, there were 90.7 males.

The median household income was $31,761 and the median family income  was $35,972. Males had a median income of $22,250 versus $25,179 for females. The per capita income for the CDP was $16,656.  About 29.2% of families and 23.8% of the population were below the poverty line, including 42.1% of those under age 18 and none of those age 65 or over.

Sites of interest
Talmage is the site of the Mendocino State Hospital (formerly the Mendocino State Asylum for the Insane), the destination for inmates charged with crimes but found not guilty by reason of insanity. The hospital first opened in 1893 with one building at a site near the town of Ukiah, and the hospital was closed in 1972. The City of Ten Thousand Buddhas, a Buddhist community and monastery, is located in the former Mendocino State Hospital. The temple also has an elementary and high school, as well as a university.

Politics

In the 2016 election, Talmage voted 48% for Donald Trump and 39% for Hillary Clinton, respectively.

References

Census-designated places in Mendocino County, California
Census-designated places in California